The 1975 UEFA Cup Final was played on 7 May and 21 May 1975 between Borussia Mönchengladbach of West Germany and Twente of the Netherlands. Mönchengladbach won 5–1 on aggregate.

Route to the final

Match details

First leg

Second leg

References
RSSSF
UEFA

2
Borussia Mönchengladbach matches
FC Twente matches
1975
International club association football competitions hosted by Germany
International club association football competitions hosted by the Netherlands
1974–75 in German football
1974–75 in Dutch football
May 1975 sports events in Europe
1970s in North Rhine-Westphalia
1975 in West German sport
Sports competitions in North Rhine-Westphalia